Venezuela has some traditional games and activities, though many are fading away because of foreign influences.

Traditional games

Bolas criollas 

Participants compete to throw heavy metal balls as close as possible to a smaller metal ball.

Carruchas 
Participants compete to race on the streets in the city of Caracas on sleds known as carruchas.

Coleo 
In coleo or colos torreados, four participants ride on horseback and try to bring down a bull as fast as possible.

Gurrufío 
Gurrufío is a 400-year old game.

Pelotica de goma 
Pelotica de goma (transl. little rubber ball) is a variation of baseball in which the only equipment used is a rubber ball. The batter starts off with the ball, hits it with a hand, and then begins running the bases, with the rest of the gameplay being similar to baseball. Baseball5 is a similar sport created by the World Baseball Softball Confederation which was partially inspired by this game.

References 

Sports originating in Venezuela